Sir Edward St John Jackson,  (14 October 1886 – 29 August 1961) was a British colonial judge and administrator.

The son of Sir Henry Moore Jackson, and his wife, Emily ( Shea), Edward St John Jackson was raised in his mother's Roman Catholic faity. He was educated at Stonyhurst College and Beaumont College (both Jesuit schools) and at Brasenose College, Oxford, where he read Law, graduating in 1908. He was called to the bar by the Inner Temple in 1910.

In 1912, he was appointed legal adviser to the Government of Gambia. In 1918, he was appointed Attorney General of the Nyasaland Protectorate, before being appointed to the High Court of the Nyasaland Protectorate in 1920. He was subsequently Attorney General of Tanganyika Territory between 1924 and 1929. He was the 23rd Attorney General of Ceylon. 

He was appointed on 12 May 1929, succeeding Lancelot Henry Elphinstone, and held the office until 1936. He was succeeded by John Curtois Howard.

Between 1937 and 1940, Jackson was Legal Secretary to the Government of Malta, and he was the Colony's Lieutenant Governor between 1940 and 1943. From 1943 to 1951 he was Chief Justice of Cyprus. In 1953 he served as judge, then Chief Judge, to the Supreme Court of the British Zone of Occupation in Germany. He also served on various government boards in relation to Germany.

Jackson was appointed King's Counsel (Ceylon) in 1929. He was made a knight bachelor in 1933, a KBE in 1941 (having previously been appointed an OBE in 1918), and KCMG in 1943.

References

Attorneys General of British Ceylon
People educated at Stonyhurst College
People educated at Beaumont College
Alumni of Brasenose College, Oxford
1886 births
1961 deaths
Knights Bachelor
Knights Commander of the Order of the British Empire
Knights Commander of the Order of St Michael and St George
Ceylonese Queen's Counsel
Attorneys-General of Nyasaland
Nyasaland judges
British Cyprus judges
Legal Secretary of Ceylon